Grāveri is a village in Alsunga Parish, Kuldīga Municipality in the Courland region of Latvia. From 2009 until 2021, it was part of the former Alsunga Municipality.

References

Kuldīga Municipality
Towns and villages in Latvia
Aizpute County
Courland